Namchang-ri is an administrative division, or village, located in Onyang, Ulju County, Ulsan, South Korea. It is located south of Ulsan city center, east of the Busan-Ulsan expressway.

See also
South Korea portal

References

External links 
 Onyang district official web site 

Ulju County
Villages in South Korea